Spook Hill is a gravity hill, an optical illusion in Lake Wales, Florida, where cars appear to roll up the spooky hill.

Spook Hill is located on the Lake Wales Ridge, a geologically significant range of sand and limestone hills, which were islands from two to three million years ago, when sea levels were much higher than at present.

The attraction is adjacent to Spook Hill Elementary School, which adopted Casper The Friendly Ghost as their school mascot. The attraction is also close to the Bok Tower.

Spook Hill received national media attention when an article about it appeared on the front page of the Wall Street Journal on October 25, 1990, and it was featured in a segment on CBS Morning News with Charles Osgood on November 5, 1990.  It was listed on the National Register of Historic Places in 2019.

See also
 List of gravity hills

References

External links

Magnetic Hill International: Spook Hill
Roadside America – Spook Hill, Lake Wales, Florida
Tampa Bay Skeptics: Do cars really roll up Spook Hill?
Spook Hill at About.com
The myth explained

Hills of Florida
Gravity hills
Lake Wales, Florida
Landforms of Polk County, Florida
Tourist attractions in Polk County, Florida
National Register of Historic Places in Polk County, Florida